Symphytum orientale is a species of flowering plant belonging to the family Boraginaceae.

Its native range is Turkey, Ukraine to Caucasus.

References

orientale